The women's 10000 metres at the 2014 European Athletics Championships took place at the Letzigrund on 12 August.

The event was run as a straight final. In a slow run, tactical race, 40-year-old British athlete Jo Pavey won the gold medal, becoming the oldest European athletics champion in the history of the event. French contenders Clémence Calvin and Laila Traby completed the podium.

Medalists

Records

Schedule

Results

References

Final Results

10000 W
10,000 metres at the European Athletics Championships
Marathons in Switzerland
2014 in women's athletics